The following is a list of the 494 communes of the Jura department of France.

The communes cooperate in the following intercommunalities (as of 2020):
Communauté d'agglomération Espace Communautaire Lons Agglomération
Communauté d'agglomération du Grand Dole
Communauté de communes Arbois, Poligny, Salins – Cœur du Jura
Communauté de communes Bresse Haute Seille
Communauté de communes Champagnole Nozeroy Jura
Communauté de communes la Grandvallière
Communauté de communes du Haut-Jura
Communauté de communes Haut-Jura Saint-Claude
Communauté de communes Jura Nord
Communauté de communes de la Plaine Jurassienne
Communauté de communes Porte du Jura
Communauté de communes de la Station des Rousses-Haut-Jura
Communauté de communes du Val d'Amour
Communauté de communes Terre d'Émeraude Communauté

References

Jura